Eighth Grade is a 2018 American coming-of-age comedy-drama film written and directed by Bo Burnham. It stars Elsie Fisher as Kayla, a middle school teenager who struggles with anxiety but strives to gain social acceptance from her peers during their final week of eighth grade. To cope, she publishes video blogs as a self-styled motivational advice-giver, though spends much of her time obsessing over social media. This frustrates Kayla's otherwise supportive father (Josh Hamilton), whom she alienates despite his wish to be present in her life as her sole parent.

The film is Burnham's feature-length debut as a writer and director. He began the screenplay in 2014 to reflect on his own anxiety and panic attacks during his career as a comedian. Deciding to convey his experience through Kayla, he also wanted to explore how her generation copes with mental illness, grows up with the presence of social media, navigates sexuality and consent, relates to their parents and develops their sense of self. Burnham aimed for realism, casting actual eighth graders—including lead actress Fisher—who informed his script and directing. For research, he watched vlogs from teenagers on YouTube, where he also discovered Fisher. Independently financed with a $2 million budget, production took place in 2017, in the suburban town of Suffern, New York.

Eighth Grade premiered on January 19, 2018 at Sundance Film Festival. It was later given wide theatrical release in the United States on July 13, 2018 by A24. Instead of appealing the Motion Picture Association of America's R (Restricted) rating of the film, A24 and Burnham arranged free all-ages theatrical screenings in every state to let their young intended audience see it.

Upon release, the film was a critical and commercial success. Burnham's writing, direction and Fisher's performance drew the most praise from critics, while domestic box office sales topped $13.5 million. The filmmakers won many awards and nominations, with Burnham winning both Writers Guild and Directors Guild of America Awards, and Fisher nominated for a Golden Globe for Best Actress and winning the Gotham Award for Breakthrough Actor. At year's end, the National Board of Review and the American Film Institute each chose Eighth Grade  as one of the top-ten films of 2018, with the former naming Burnham's film as the year's Best Directorial Debut.

Plot
Kayla Day is an eighth grader in her final week at Miles Grove Middle School, a public school in a small New York town. She posts motivational vlogs on YouTube about confidence and self-image that receive few to no views. Nervous and struggling to make friends at school, she is voted "Most Quiet" by her classmates. Meanwhile, her single father Mark struggles to connect with her and break her reliance on social media.

Kayla is invited to popular classmate Kennedy's pool party by Kennedy's mother. At the party, she has a panic attack in the bathroom but eventually goes outside to swim, where she meets Kennedy's nerdy cousin Gabe. After trying to leave the party early, she has an awkward encounter with her crush Aiden, who suggests that she rejoin the party. She overcomes her fear and volunteers to sing karaoke.

Hearing that Aiden broke up with his last girlfriend because she refused to send him nude photos of herself, Kayla tells Aiden that she has a folder of dirty photos of herself on her phone, a lie which piques his interest. He asks if she gives blowjobs; unsure of what to say, she says she does, but she later looks up oral sex instructions on YouTube and is disgusted by what she finds.

Kayla attends a high school shadow program, where she meets a friendly senior named Olivia who shows her around the school. Olivia gives Kayla her number and later invites her to the mall with some friends. They have a good time, but a mortified Kayla spots her father spying from afar and orders him to leave. Olivia's friend Riley gives Kayla a ride home from the mall and initiates an awkward game of truth or dare in which he asks about her sexual experience, takes off his shirt, and asks her to remove hers. She refuses and he backs off, angrily claiming he was just trying to help her gain some experience. Kayla breaks down at home and is comforted by Mark.

Kayla makes a video announcing that she intends to stop making videos, as she is not the person she pretends to be and feels unfit to give advice. She opens a time capsule she created for herself in sixth grade. She watches a video in which her past self asks questions about her current friends and love life. She asks Mark to help her burn the time capsule and asks if she makes him sad. He says that she fills him with pride and he could never be sad about her, prompting her to hug him tightly.

At graduation, Kayla rebukes Kennedy for ignoring her and acting indifferent toward Kayla's attempts to be nice. She later has dinner at Gabe's house and they enjoy their time together. Kayla makes a new time capsule that she and Mark bury in the backyard, and she leaves a video message for her future high school self which encourages her to persevere through tough times.

Cast
The cast includes:
 Elsie Fisher as Kayla Day
 Josh Hamilton as Mark Day
 Emily Robinson as Olivia
 Catherine Oliviere as Kennedy Graves
 Jake Ryan as Gabe
 Luke Prael as Aiden Wilson
 Daniel Zolghadri as Riley
 Fred Hechinger as Trevor
 Imani Lewis as Aniyah

Themes
The film explores anxiety. Professor Julianna W. Miner, writing in 2018 about Eighth Grade, reflects that 22% of teenagers were struggling with depression and anxiety, and teenage girls were dying by suicide at higher rates in 2015 than they were in the previous 40 years. The anxiety depicted is typical in middle school, but according to reporter Valerie Strauss, also reflects life in 2018 where people of all ages see a "cacophony of indifference and downright meanness". The words "um" and "like" in the screenplay also reflect "the process of struggling", rather than the characters' lack of intelligence.

Critic Owen Gleiberman wrote that Eighth Grade was a trailblazer in examining youth who never knew a world without the Internet, touching on sexting as well. CBS News also commented that besides "the usual teen angst and acne", Eighth Grade depicts how Kayla spends a great deal of time online and engaging in text messaging. This reflects general trends in "iGen" (post-millennials), where 94% of youth have used smartphones by age 14. A 2018 U.S. poll found 45% of teenagers reported "almost constantly" online. 24% called its effects "mostly negative", while 45% characterized it as "neither negative nor positive".

According to Elsie Fisher, "for Kayla, social media is almost religious". Burnham explained, "social media has made me think differently as a person. It's made me more anxious, I think". Professor Jean Twenge also connected an increase in Internet usage to a decline in juvenile mental health. Gleiberman called the depiction an examination of "overwhelming — and, I would argue, unprecedented — woe that teenagers today can feel". Author Robert Barker contrasted Eighth Grade to earlier coming-of-age films such as Fast Times at Ridgemont High (1982) and Mean Girls (2004). Rather than work through cliques, Barker wrote, Kayla and others are on "a digital war of all against all, preening, pretending, and pontificating as much to themselves as to an anonymous audience". Barker also saw the sexting between characters as representing their obliviousness to lost innocence. NPR interpreted the impact of the Internet during maturation as "one of the key subjects of Eighth Grade", commenting on how many people may not remember the age fondly, but social media has added complications. Even so, NPR stated Kayla is still able to grow despite great challenges.

According to critic Kyle Buchanan, "The biggest mystery to ... [Kayla] is the opposite sex", considering her interest in Aiden and taking online lessons about fellatio. However, journalist Chris O'Falt suggested Kayla is not truly ready for sex, but simply is "pressured to barter [her] sexuality for social acceptance". Time mentioned Kayla's claim to Aiden that she has nude selfies as being among the "classic middle-school indignities" depicted in Eighth Grade.

Burnham also criticized American sex education for not exploring sexual consent, as reflected in the "truth or dare" scene. Although Kayla is shown in a sex education class earlier in the film, she does not know how to react when Riley sexually coerces her, and apologizes to him for rejecting his advances. Film critics connected the scene with the Me Too movement, though it was written before the movement began. At festival screenings, moviegoers were visibly uncomfortable and yelled during the scene.

The story also explores Kayla's relationship with her father, Mark, a member of Generation X, from whom she is breaking away, exhibiting typical behavior for her age. His attempts to communicate with her are frustrated by her fixation with her smartphone. However, journalist Sonia Rao judged Mark to be "the only constant presence in her life"; Mark is devoted to Kayla and later tells her he is proud of her.

Production

Development

As a touring comedian, Bo Burnham suffered from panic attacks related to his performances since 2013. While his main intention was to write a story about anxiety, he chose the setting of eighth grade because of his perspective that "anxiety makes me feel like a terrified thirteen-year-old." He also reflected on his notion that eighth grade is a crucial year for forming self-awareness:

Burnham was also inspired by observing a girl in a mall taking selfies while alone; he believed she was concerned about her appearance. Given his career started with producing YouTube videos, he also wanted to explore the life of a character whose videos have very small audiences. Work on the screenplay began in March 2014. Kayla was not the sole protagonist in an initial draft of the screenplay, but Burnham decided to focus on her because her voice felt the most true of the characters. He decided his protagonist would be female after watching YouTube, saying, "the boys talk about Minecraft and the girls talk about their souls ... probably half because girls are just actually maturing more quickly and half because culture asks way deeper questions of young women earlier than men". He also liked the idea of a female protagonist to avoid "projecting" his personal memories of eighth grade as a male. The film's working title was The Coolest Girl in the World.

To write dialogue representing Generation Z, Burnham watched YouTube. Burnham's personal views on the differences between Generation Z and its predecessors inspired a scene where the character Trevor theorizes access to social media at an early age molded the generation's minds. Kayla and Mark's relationship is based on Burnham's relationship with his mother. Burnham viewed a teenager's relationship with their parent as a stage where "You want independence, and you also want affirmation".

Scott Rudin, Eli Bush, and A24 would go on to produce the movie with a budget of $2 million.  A24 executive Nicolette Aizenberg remarked Eighth Grade was "personal" to her. Burnham spent years seeking financing, confident he was marketable with his success as a comedian.  Although he had not directed a feature before, Burnham was adamant to be allowed to direct, and spent eight months before principal photography reading books such as Sidney Lumet's Making Movies.

Casting
Fifty teenagers auditioned for the role of Kayla. Burnham discovered Elsie Fisher on YouTube and had her audition three times. Fisher, then 13, said she had struggled to find a part realistically depicting a teenager before auditioning for Eighth Grade. Burnham cast Fisher because, "She was the only one who felt like a shy kid pretending to be confident – everyone else felt like a confident kid pretending to be shy". Fisher said one reason she was apprehensive at the first audition was that she was a fan of Burnham's comedy. She was drawn to the part because Kayla's speech mannerisms are similar to hers. She had graduated eighth grade one week before the production began. Upon reviewing the screenplay, Fisher's father shouted and swore reading the "truth or dare" scene, but made sure his daughter was comfortable with the material.

Burnham considered Josh Hamilton to have a "dad vibe". Daniel Zolghadri was cast as Riley. Because of the "truth or dare" scene, many young actors who auditioned played the part as sinister, but Burnham coached Zolghadri to be "the opposite of creepy". Emily Robinson and Imani Lewis were teenagers when cast and both said they found the depiction of anxiety relatable. Jake Ryan, who played Gabe, remarked that in the screenplay Gabe "was supposed to be off-centered", and not knowing the meaning of this phrase, played himself.

Actual teachers and students at Suffern Middle School in New York were used as extras, with principal Brian Fox saying five to ten students were cast. During the audition process for the real-life eighth graders, one student claimed having eczema was her "special talent" and another auditioned by "eating a bell pepper like an apple." Burnham accepted this as a qualification. Band teacher Dave Yarrington said Burnham cast him because he "liked my look".

Filming

The film was shot in Suffern, New York in summer 2017, over 27 days, with shooting at Suffern Middle School in July. For the mall scenes, exterior shots were taken at Palisades Center in West Nyack, New York, while interior scenes were shot at the nearby The Galleria at White Plains.

Burnham chose not to obscure the natural look of Fisher's skin, who wore some make-up but whose acne was left visible. Kayla's use of the phrase "Gucci!" to sign-off her video blogs came from Fisher's habit of ending conversations this way, which was also imitated by Burnham and others on set. Fisher's other habits of slouching and rubbing her arm were also incorporated into her character. The filmmakers adopted Fisher's advice that "no one uses Facebook anymore" in regards to teenagers, and it was substituted in the film with Instagram. Beyond minor changes, improvisation was rarely employed.

To depict texting, Burnham rejected using visual effects to show messages as on-screen bubbles, as in House of Cards. He opted for a "practical" portrayal, filming the phones themselves. Kayla's video blogs were shot with an actual MacBook Pro. Because the actual Internet was depicted, production designer Sam Lisenco and prop designer Erica Severson created many false Instagram and Twitter accounts. The filmmakers primarily used Red Digital Cinema cameras and wide lenses, with Burnham favoring the use of camera zooming.

The "truth or dare" scene was shot with only eight crew members along with Fisher and Zolghadri. Fisher had the screenplay on her lap to read when her character was looking down. She explained, "We just wanted to take a sensitive approach and just be honest about this, and portray a type of toxic event that can happen." Due to Fisher being underage when shooting the banana scene, it was similarly shot with minimal crew present.

Post-production

Burnham and editor Jennifer Lilly did not complete post-production until three days before the film's premiere at Sundance in January 2018. Fisher singing in Masha and the Bear at age 11 was used in the film.

Scottish electronic composer and solo musician Anna Meredith wrote and recorded the film's score in her London studio. Deliberately avoiding a "cute" score, Burnham turned to electronic music because "Kayla's experience feels so intense to her," and chose Meredith since her style was unlike "a lot of electronic music […] very cold and masculine." As her first film score, Meredith described the process as a "challenge," emphasizing that as a composer, "you don't just present the music you want. You try to do what the film needs."

Burnham used "Orinoco Flow" by Irish musician Enya for a montage scene of Kayla browsing social media. He wanted to use the song to convey that the social media experience was "religious" and "spiritual" for Kayla, and wrote a letter to Enya for her personal permission to use the song, which she granted.

Release
The film premiered in competition at the 2018 Sundance Film Festival on January 19, and was subsequently screened at the San Francisco International Film Festival in April. Eighth Grade also screened at the Seattle International Film Festival at its closing weekend in June 2018.

A24 gave Eighth Grade its limited release on July 13, before moving it to wide release August 3. The Motion Picture Association of America gave Eighth Grade an R rating for profanity and content about fellatio. Burnham had the option to edit the film to secure a more permissive PG-13 but chose not to do so, commenting, "It didn't feel like our responsibility to portray a reality that was appropriate for kids, but rather portray the reality that the kids are actually living in". Critics decried the MPAA's decision for denying teenage viewers a film with positive messages. MPAA representative Chris Ortman stated A24 never appealed the R rating, though having the right to do so. Burnham regretted the rating because it excluded middle school-aged youth. To get around the rating, A24 arranged one free, unrated screening in each U.S. state on August 8. Burnham approved of Canada's 14A rating. Eighth Grade began screening in Canadian cities on August 3.

In September 2018, Sony Pictures Worldwide Acquisitions acquired international distribution rights to the film. Lionsgate prepared the DVD and Blu-ray release in Region 1 with a director's commentary and deleted scenes, for distribution beginning October 9. The film was released in Belgium and the Netherlands in February 2019. United Kingdom and Irish releases occurred on April 26, 2019.

Reception

Box office
Eighth Grades opening weekend in four theaters beginning July 13 saw a gross of $252,284, an average of $63,071 per screen. It surpassed Wes Anderson's Isle of Dogs ($60,011) for the best per-screen average of 2018, and was in-turn surpassed by Free Solo ($75,201) at the end of September. Eighth Grade expanded to 33 theaters in its second weekend, grossing $794,370, and then made $1.3 million from 158 theaters in its third weekend. The film began its wide release on August 3 at 1,084 theaters, and earned $6.6 million by August 6.

By August 16 the film earned $10.5 million, the sixth-highest grossing independent domestic film of the summer. By September 26 it had grossed $13.5 million in North America.  it has grossed $14.3 million worldwide.

Critical response
The website's critical consensus reads, "Eighth Grade takes a look at its titular time period that offers a rare and resounding ring of truth while heralding breakthroughs for writer-director Bo Burnham and captivating star Elsie Fisher." On Metacritic, the film has a weighted average score of 89 out of 100, based on 49 critics, indicating "universal acclaim".

Richard Roeper judged the film "sweet and intelligent" and credited Fisher for "an authentic and utterly natural performance".  Ty Burr also cited Fisher for a performance showing "supreme awkwardness and not a shred of vanity" and Josh Hamilton for playing his part with "an empathetic cringe". The New York Times Manohla Dargis cited Josh Hamilton as "note-perfect". Ann Hornaday of The Washington Post highlighted Fisher for "a raw, radiantly generous performance". Varietys Peter Debruge judged the film "achingly honest" but clichéd in having Kayla infatuated with one boy (played by Luke Prael) and ignoring a better love interest (played by Jake Ryan) until the later acts.

Peter Travers hailed Eighth Grade as "special and unique" for its "empathy", writing it is neutral on the Internet's effects on society but Kayla is addicted to electronics. For The New Yorker, Naomi Fry credited Eighth Grade with "queasy verisimilitude" and exploring the impact of social media on the lives of teenagers. Forbes contributor Dani Di Placido wrote the depiction of electronics was better than in most films, showing they were "powerful communicative tools that can isolate us, or bring us together, depending on how we choose to use them". Considering how Burnham first achieved notoriety on the Internet, Chicago Tribune critic Michael Phillips wrote Burnham was familiar with "the agitating seductions of our online lives".

In the Los Angeles Times, Justin Chang evaluated Eighth Grade as "sharp, sensitive and enormously affecting". Entertainment Weekly gave it an A, with Chris Nashawaty praising Burnham for capturing Kayla's anxiety and hopes, depicted "in all of their miraculous, cringeworthy, universal beauty". The A.V. Club named the scenes between Fisher and Hamilton to be among the "funniest, most poignant" scenes. SF Gate critic Peter Hartlaub wrote the comedy is combined with "pure social and sexual horror". Benjamin Lee commented on the score in The Guardian, writing the use of electronic music was unexpected but "effective".

Media outlets also referenced actress Molly Ringwald's approval. Ringwald tweeted "I just saw [Eighth Grade] and thought it was the best film about adolescence I've seen in a long time. Maybe ever". Ringwald contrasted the depiction of consent in Eighth Grade to that in John Hughes' The Breakfast Club (1985), which she starred in, concluding Burnham's film was more updated. Eighth Grade has been favorably compared with Hughes' filmography generally.

Adam Chitwood wrote a mixed review on Collider.com, calling it "a rough draft" that needed editing to convey its points. Richard Brody in The New Yorker wrote the film was let down by "sentiment, stereotypes, and good intentions", and despite Fisher's performance, "Kayla remains merely a collection of traits". The Missoula Independents Molly Laich compared the realism to being "drilled at the dentist".

Accolades

The film was entered into competition for the Grand Jury Prize at the 2018 Sundance Film Festival. It had four nominations at the Independent Spirit Awards, including Best Film, winning Best First Screenplay. Fisher received her first Golden Globe nomination for the film, but the film was not nominated for Best Motion Picture – Musical or Comedy despite reporter Kyle Buchanan considering it to be A24's best candidate for the category.

Burnham and Fisher each won Breakthrough awards at the Gotham Awards. Eighth Grade additionally won two National Board of Review Awards, including being named in the Top Ten Films of 2018; the American Film Institute also included it in its annual top 10. The film was nominated for three Satellite Awards, including Best Independent Film, and three Critics' Choice Awards, winning Best Young Performer for Fisher. Additionally, Burnham won the Directors Guild of America Award for Outstanding First-Time Feature and the Writers Guild of America Award for Best Original Screenplay.

References

External links
 
 

2018 films
2018 directorial debut films
2010s coming-of-age comedy-drama films
A24 (company) films
American coming-of-age comedy-drama films
2018 independent films
American independent films
2010s English-language films
Films about children
Films about social media
Films directed by Bo Burnham
Films set in 2017
Films set in New York (state)
Films shot in New York (state)
Films with screenplays by Bo Burnham
Middle school films
Films about father–daughter relationships
Films about puberty
2010s American films